Samoset is an unincorporated community and census-designated place (CDP) in Manatee County, Florida, United States. The population was 4,146 at the 2020 census, up from 3,854 in 2010. It is part of the Bradenton–Sarasota–Venice Metropolitan Statistical Area.

History
Samoset was incorporated as a city in September 1926, and had a reported population of 1,034. The name of Samoset may have come from an Algonquin Indian, but a newspaper article at the time reported that the township was named for a flag station of the Atlantic Coast Line Railroad. The new city's seal consisted of an Indian head, a palm tree, and the year 1926, all surrounded by the name "Samoset" and Florida at the bottom. There were a few subdivisions that were developed before the incorporation, consisting of Listville, Hill Park, and Pinecrest, all of which were consolidated into the new city of Samoset. 

William A. Thomas built the new community's first general store, a two-story brick building, in 1925. The original boundaries of the township ran south from the Bradenton city limits to present-day Cortez Road along 1st Street and a mile east of old Bradenton-Sarasota Road. The city of Manatee bordered it on the north, but it merged with Bradenton in 1944 and is now known as East Bradenton. Manatee's original borders ran from 1st Street to Braden River.

Early pioneers Thomas, George, and Luke Wyatt, and Eva Felts secured the installation of power lines from Southern Power Company. Upon incorporation, R.R. Rodeman, a developer, was elected the town's first mayor. G.L. Bryant was made city clerk, W.W. Fry town marshal, and Claud Schafer, George Wyatt, W.D. Thomas, C.A. Bingham, and E.F. Staples made up the city council. New mayor Rodeman was the developer of the above-mentioned subdivisions as well as that of Sunshine Ridge. Within days of the town's incorporation, a group of 20 residents organized in a bid to dissolve the new incorporation, but the move failed. 

Meanwhile, a new school opened in October 1926, and had an enrollment of 30 children and was housed in the community hall. A teacher, Mrs. Charles Bingham, taught second and third grades. Another teacher, Mrs. Gladys La Croix, instructed 55 more children in the primary room (probably kindergarten and first grades). In March 1927, a post office opened and city clerk Joseph E. Bryant was made postmaster, and a stand-alone building was subsequently constructed. A new church, Missionary Baptist, was founded in May of that year and consisted of 20 parishioners.

In August 1927, Samoset residents' election was held, and S. Ed Curry succeeded outgoing mayor R.R. Rodeman, while J.P. Haynes and W.D. Thomas were elected to city council. In addition, E.B. Johnson was elected city clerk and F.A. Schmacher was marshal. In June 1928, another move to abolish the new town failed and the town continued on, until December when the move to abolish the town finally went through by a vote of 115 to 31. After the dissolution, the area returned to unincorporated, rural status.

Geography
Samoset is located at  (27.474567, -82.542817). It is bordered to the north by the city of Bradenton and to the west by unincorporated West Samoset.

U.S. Route 301 passes through the center of the community, leading northwest into Bradenton and south  to Sarasota.

Demographics

As of the census of 2000, there were 3,440 people, 1,114 households, and 817 families residing in the CDP. The racial makeup of the CDP was 63.02% White, 26.51% African American, 0.38% Native American, 0.12% Asian, 0.03% Pacific Islander, 7.33% from other races, and 2.62% from two or more races. Hispanic or Latino of any race were 17.67% of the population.

There were 1,114 households, out of which 38.3% had children under the age of 18 living with them, 47.1% were married couples living together, 18.6% had a female householder with no husband present, and 26.6% were non-families. 21.3% of all households were made up of individuals, and 8.2% had someone living alone who was 65 years of age or older.  The average household size was 3.06 and the average family size was 3.50.

In the CDP, the population was spread out, with 32.1% under the age of 18, 9.6% from 18 to 24, 29.8% from 25 to 44, 19.5% from 45 to 64, and 9.0% who were 65 years of age or older.  The median age was 32 years. For every 100 females, there were 98.0 males.  For every 100 females age 18 and over, there were 93.0 males.

The median income for a household in the CDP was $29,962, and the median income for a family was $32,700. Males had a median income of $27,044 versus $22,147 for females. The per capita income for the CDP was $10,915.  About 18.1% of families and 22.5% of the population were below the poverty line, including 32.1% of those under age 18 and 24.5% of those age 65 or over.

Climate
Climate is characterized by relatively high temperatures and evenly distributed precipitation throughout the year.  The Köppen Climate Classification subtype for this climate is "Cfa" (Humid Subtropical Climate).

References

Census-designated places in Manatee County, Florida
Sarasota metropolitan area
Census-designated places in Florida